HKBN bbTV is a discontinued Pay TV IPTV service in Hong Kong operated by Hong Kong Broadband Network which was launched in August 2003, and bbTV ceased its service at 1 January 2017.

In September 2017, it is planned to reopen bbTV, but will be changed to Next at Malaysia Biggest TV Provider-Astro.

See also
IPTV
Hong Kong Broadband Network

References

External links
bbTV Official web-site

Television stations in Hong Kong
Television channels and stations established in 2003
Television channels and stations disestablished in 2017